F103 is the internal designation for a series of car models produced by Auto Union GmbH (after merger with NSU Motorenwerke in 1969: Audi NSU Auto Union) in West Germany from 1965 to 1972, derived from the earlier DKW F102. To signify the change from a two-stroke to four-stroke engine, the DKW marque was dropped in favour of Audi, a name that had been dormant since before the Second World War.

Models
The first model was launched simply as the  Audi, later being renamed the Audi 72 (72 being the nominal power output of the engine in PS).

The more powerful Audi 80 and Audi Super 90 sports saloons (with 80 and 90 PS respectively) appeared in 1966: in 1968 the arrival of the less powerful Audi 60 completed the range. Breaking somewhat with the naming pattern, the Audi 60 has , although export versions produce .

The Audi 75 replaced both the Audi 72 and the Audi 80 from 1969 onwards.

In 1972 the F103 series was discontinued in favour of the "B1" Audi 80.

Engines
The F103 series were equipped exclusively with the M118 four-cylinder four-stroke engine. These were longitudinally mounted. This combination of front-wheel drive, which Auto Union's DKW brand had pioneered during the 1930s, and the longitudinal positioning of a four-cylinder engine would provide the basic template for Volkswagen's successful new Passat as well as the Audi models Audi 80 and Audi 100 after Volkswagenwerk AG acquired the Auto Union from Daimler-Benz late in 1964. Since the chassis on the F103 was taken from the DKW F102 with a three-cylinder two-stroke engine, the longer engine meant that the cooling system had to be offset to the left of the engine instead of the normal position in front of it. Because of the radiator's location, the front cylinder of the engine had a tendency to run cooler than the other three and as a consequence the spark plug tended to foul up, particularly if the engine was often used in city traffic. To avoid this, it was often recommended to run a hotter spark plug (with a lower heat range) in the front cylinder than in the other three.

The engines of the F103 series were developed by Daimler-Benz as part of a military project that never came to fruition. They were dubbed the Mitteldruckmotor (medium-pressure engines) because of their unusually high BMEP (mean effective pressure, as calculated from brake torque) values, which led to a good thermodynamic efficiency. The engines had spiral-formed intake channels that gave the fuel-air mixture a good swirl. The engine had Heron-type combustion chambers with broad squish bands, further enhancing the mixture swirl and aiding good combustion. These features made it possible to use very high compression ratios for the time. The initial engine version had a compression ratio of 11:1 for 98 RON fuel and even the engines intended for 92 RON fuel had a compression of 9:1, which was a very unusually high value for the time.

Running gear
The car came with a four-speed manual transmission.

Inboard mounted front disc brakes were featured, which was still unusual in the mid-size car market at this time.  The rear brakes followed the more conventional drum configuration.

Bodywork

The F103 bodyshell was a development of the earlier DKW F102. The engine compartment had to be extended so that the new four-cylinder engine could be accommodated. The front and tail were also cosmetically revised: Audi F103s sold in Europe all featured quasi-rectangular headlamps which were becoming fashionable at the time, whereas the F102 had used round headlamp units.

All Audi F103 models were offered as sedans with two and four doors. The two-door saloon/sedan, however, was not sold in markets such as Italy and Britain with little demand for two-door cars of this size.

With the exception of the Audi Super 90, the F103 series were available also as three-door station wagon models. Making its debut at the Geneva Motor Show in March 1966, this was called, like the Volkswagen estate/station wagon models, Variant.

Evolution
Initial changes were concentrated under the hood/bonnet where during the first two years of production the specification for the Solex carburetor was changed twice and in September 1967 the very high compression ratio was reduced from a (then) eye watering 11.2:1 to 9.1:1 which addressed serious "teething problems" with the engine as originally launched.

In September 1967 servo-assistance for the brakes became an option, the brakes on all but the basic model now being controlled using twin braking circuits, and by (in Germany) the final months of 1968 the range had settled down to three models, with the entry level Audi 60 powered by a 55 PS motor, the less basic Audi 75 producing 75 PS and the Audi Super 90 with 90 PS, able to challenge the performance image of some of the smaller BMWs.

Visually the car changed very little, but keen eyed observers would have noticed a discreetly modernised rear from August 1970, with slightly larger rear lights and a reshaped bumper.   The fuel filler moved from its location to the right of the license plate on the rear panel to a position on the right hand wing of the car, and following a general trend of the period was now shielded by a flap that was flush with the bodywork. Inside the 1970 upgrade also involved a reconfigured dashboard.

Sales
During the early 1960s, Auto Union was in commercial retreat: the Audi F103 was a relative success when compared with recent Auto Union products, even if its commercial success was trumped by subsequent Audi models.   In July 1967, it was reported that 100,000 Audis had been completed: production of the F103 had by now built up to a rate of almost 40,000 per year and the company was moved to deny speculation that another new Audi model would be presented at the Frankfurt Motor Show in the Autumn / Fall of 1967. (The Audi 100 was introduced only towards the end of 1968.)

Specifications
Manufacturer's figures except where stated

References

External links

 Good overview of the development of the DKW F103 to the Audi 60 (in German)
 A Super 90 at a vintage rally
 Website Audi60.com

F103
Executive cars
Mid-size cars
Sedans
Station wagons
Front-wheel-drive vehicles
Cars introduced in 1965
1970s cars